Tungkuan may refer to one of the following locations in China:

The old name of Dongguan, Guangdong
Tongguan County, Shaanxi, famous for its historical pass
Tungkuan, Taiwan